Boxing in Barrels is a silent film written and released by Lubin Studios in 1901. It features a man and a clown boxing in a barrel.

See also
 List of American films of 1901
Lubin Studios
Boxing

External links

1901 films
American silent short films
American black-and-white films
1901 comedy films
Silent American comedy films
1901 short films
American comedy short films
American boxing films
1900s American films